Re-Wind is a remix double album by Vancouver industrial band Front Line Assembly, released in 1998. All tracks were originally recorded for the band's previous studio album  [FLA]vour of the Weak (some as b-sides). The band's longtime mixer, Greg Reely, had been absent on the original album and was brought back in on Re-Wind; therefore, disc one sees the band remixing itself with Reely's help. Disc two presents remixes by other artists.

Release
The track "Predator (Final Mix by Collide)" is featured on the soundtrack album from 2006 thriller The Covenant. According to Collide, the original name of the remix is "Radioactive Mix". On account of an oversight at the label the name "Final Mix" appeared on the CD.

In 2016, Canadian label Artoffact reissued the album on vinyl.

Track listing

Personnel

Front Line Assembly
 Bill Leeb – mixing (Disc 1)
 Chris Peterson – mixing (Disc 1)
 Karin – additional vocals (Disc 2: 2)

Technical personnel
 Greg Reely – mixing (Disc 1)
 Joe Varkey – assistant mixing (Disc 1)
 Brian Gardner – mastering (Disc 1)
 Meran – design, illustration, photography
 Fini Tribe – additional production (Disc 2: 7)

References

Front Line Assembly albums
1998 remix albums
Metropolis Records remix albums
Industrial remix albums
Albums produced by Chris Peterson (producer)